Vernon Anthony Adams Jr. (born January 3, 1993) is an American professional Canadian football quarterback for the BC Lions of the Canadian Football League (CFL). He played college football for the Eastern Washington Eagles and Oregon Ducks. He has also been a member of the Montreal Alouettes, Hamilton Tiger-Cats, and Saskatchewan Roughriders.

Early years
Adams graduated from Bishop Alemany High School in Mission Hills, Los Angeles, in 2011. In his final two seasons, he passed for 5,234 yards and 49 touchdowns, and rushed for another 1,263 yards and 19 more scores in leading Alemany to an overall record of 22–5.

As a junior, Adams passed for 2,333 yards and 22 touchdowns, and also rushed for 367 yards and five scores. He led Alemany to a 10–4 record.

As a senior, he was selected the Serra League Most Valuable Player after leading the Warriors to the league title in 2010. He earned first team all-league honors for the second-straight season. Alemany won its first 12 games before losing its final game of the season, 28–21, against eventual champion Servite High School in the semifinals of the CIF Southern Section Pac-5 Playoffs. He passed for 2,901 yards with 27 touchdowns and nine interceptions, and had 896 yards rushing with 14 touchdowns.

Coming out of high school, Adams did not receive any scholarship offers from Football Bowl Subdivision schools, due in part to concerns regarding his height. He would eventually receive only two scholarships offers from Football Championship Subdivision schools Portland State and Eastern Washington. Adams originally made a verbal commitment to Portland State, but flipped on National Signing Day and signed with Eastern Washington.

College career

Eastern Washington

2012
After redshirting the 2011 season as Eastern Washington's Offensive Scout Team Player of the Year, Adams would split time at quarterback with Junior Kyle Padron in 2012. Starting in nine of twelve games, Adams helped lead the Eagles to the FCS playoff semifinals and finished the year with 1,961 yards passing, 20 touchdowns to 8 interceptions and a 160.80 pass efficiency rating, which was the fourth-best mark in the FCS that year.

In the Eagles' playoff loss to Sam Houston State, Adams came off of the bench in the second half, completing 14-of-26 passes for 364 yards and a school-record six touchdowns, nearly rallying the Eagles from a 35–0 halftime deficit.

Adams freshman season came with multiple accolades where he selected as the Freshman of the Year on the College Sporting News "Fabulous 50" All-America team and named to the College Sports Journal Freshman All-America squad.  He was also one of 20 players on the ballot for the Jerry Rice Award, given to the top freshman in FCS by The Sports Network, which he finished in sixth place.

2013
Entering his sophomore season as the unquestioned starter, Adams catapulted himself onto the national stage when he engineered a 49–46 upset win at #25 Oregon State as he passed for 411 yards and four touchdowns while also rushing for 107 yards and two touchdowns. For his performance, Adams became the first-ever FCS player to be included in the HeismanPundit.com straw poll.

With a 12–3 record, Adams led the Eagles to the Big Sky Conference Championship and the NCAA Division I Semifinal while being named Big Sky All-Conference 1st Team, Big Sky Offensive Player of the Year, and selected as the FCS National Performer of the Year by College Football Performance Awards, the top overall honor given out by the CFPA at the FCS level. He also finished second in the voting for the Walter Payton Award.

Starting in all 15 games, Adams threw for 4,994 yards with 55 touchdown passes while also rushing for 605 yards.

2014
Adams entered his junior season as one of the most high-profile players at the FCS level. He would lead his team to a third-straight Big Sky Conference championship and a third-straight trip to the FCS playoffs. Adams' per-game averages for total offensive yards (376.8), passing yards (348.3) and points responsible for (24.8) were tops in the nation, but he didn't play enough games to officially be listed in NCAA statistics. Adams broke two bones in his foot during a win over Idaho State on October 4, causing him to miss four games.

Against Washington on September 5, Adams completed 31 of 46 passes for 475 yards and seven touchdowns in a 59–52 loss. The seven touchdowns were the most the Huskies had allowed to an opposing quarterback at home in school history.

Adams received a number of postseason awards, to include being named the Big Sky Conference Offensive Player of the Year and First-Team All-Big Sky Conference for the second-straight year. He was also named a First-Team All-American by the Associated Press. Adams was again a finalist for the Walter Payton Award, but was the runner-up for the second-straight year, losing to John Robertson of Villanova.

In January, Adams asked for, and was granted, a release from his scholarship from Eastern Washington so that he could speak to other programs in regards to transferring for his senior season. Adams contacted Oregon, UCLA, and Boise State. Texas and Maryland also contacted Adams in regards to transferring.

Oregon

On February 9, 2015, Adams announced his plans to accept a scholarship to Oregon and transfer for his senior season, choosing to play for the Ducks over remaining at Eastern Washington. However, later that summer it was reported that Adams needed to complete a math course in order to graduate from Eastern Washington University.  On August 13, 2015, he passed the math class to graduate from Eastern Washington and officially joined the Oregon Ducks. After just two weeks on campus, Adams was named the starting quarterback on August 28. His first start came against his former team, Eastern Washington. Adams started 10 games and passed for 2,643 yards, 26 touchdowns and six interceptions, while leading the nation in passing efficiency with a 179.1 rating.

College statistics

Note: Total QB Rating or QBR is a proprietary quarterback rating metric owned and used by ESPN. Adams' game while attending EWU were not evaluated by ESPN for QBR. For college football games, ESPN uses two forms of their QBR metric: a raw version and an adjusted version. This is to account for the wide variation in defensive talent among college football teams. The adjusted QBR is used in this table.

College awards
 East-West Shrine Game Offensive MVP (2016)
 PAC-12 Newcomer of the Year (2015)
 Honorable Mention All-Pac-12 (2015)
 College Football Performance Awards FCS National Performer of the Year (2013)
 First Team FCS All-American (AP) (2014)
 First Team FCS All-American (AP, TSN) (2013)
 First Team FCS All-American College Sporting News (2012)
 2× First Team All-Big Sky Conference (2013, 2014)
 2× Big Sky Conference Offensive Player of the Year (2013, 2014)
 2x Passing Efficiency Rating Statistical Champion NCAA (2013-183.4, 2015–179.1)

Professional career

NFL 
Adams went undrafted in the 2016 NFL Draft. After the draft, he accepted an invitation to attend the Seattle Seahawks rookie mini-camp on a tryout basis. However, after the mini-camp was finished, the Seahawks decided not to sign Adams. Following that, Adams attended the Washington Redskins rookie mini-camp as a tryout.

Montreal Alouettes 
On May 18, 2016, the BC Lions of the Canadian Football League revealed that they were negotiating with Adams who was on their negotiation list. Two days later his rights were traded to the Montreal Alouettes in exchange for a 1st-round pick in the 2017 CFL Draft. In response, Vernon Adams tweeted "Can't wait to get to Montreal Alouettes. Thank you God." It was announced that Adams had signed with the Alouettes on May 22, 2016, to a three-year contract. On October 22, he started his first game for the Alouettes. Adams started the final three games of the regular season, throwing four touchdowns and rushing for another while winning all three games. The Alouettes finished the 2016 season in second last place in the East division with a record of 7–11, missing the playoffs. Adams dressed for the first seven games of the 2017 season as a backup for the Alouettes, and scoring one rushing touchdown.

Saskatchewan Roughriders 
On August 15, 2017, Adams, along with the Alouettes' fifth round pick in the 2018 CFL Draft, was traded to the Saskatchewan Roughriders for Tevaughn Campbell, a third round pick in the 2018 CFL Draft and a third round pick in the 2019 CFL Draft. With the Roughriders, Adams served as a backup and short yardage rusher, with three scores on the ground.

Hamilton Tiger-Cats 
During the off-season, Adams was traded to the Hamilton Tiger-Cats on February 2, 2018, for all-star defensive lineman Charleston Hughes. On June 7, 2018, it was reported that Adams was about to be traded; however, that never materialized and he returned to the Ti-Cats as a wide receiver. Adams never played a game for Hamilton; on June 21, 2018, Adams was one of three players released by the Tiger-Cats.

Montreal Alouettes (II) 
On June 26, 2018, Adams was re-signed by the Montreal Alouettes. Adams started for the Alouettes in the team's Week 7 loss to the Edmonton Eskimos, completing 15 of 28 pass attempts for 217 yards with one interception, along with 72 yards rushing and a rushing touchdown. He replaced Johnny Manziel the following week following Manziel's interception-plagued CFL debut, and scored another rushing touchdown, but was subsequently listed as out "two to six weeks with a foot injury". Adams missed the rest of the year, but was signed a two-year contract extension with the Alouettes on October 28, 2018 alongside several other quarterbacks.

Adams began the 2019 season as the Als' backup quarterback behind Antonio Pipkin. However, after Pipkin suffered a leg injury early in the season, Adams was announced the starting quarterback. Adams went on to start the next five games for the Alouettes, playing very well, winning three games in a row before suffering a concussion against the Redblacks in Week 8. Adams returned from injury in Week 10 and led the Alouettes to a come-from-behind victory over the defending champion Calgary Stampeders. Adams continued his stellar play late into the season, leading the Alouettes to multiple come-from-behind victories, propelling his team to second place in the East Division with a record of 7-5. However, in one of those victories Adams ripped the helmet of Winnipeg Blue Bombers linebacker Adam Bighill off his head and then swung the helmet at Bighill's head. The play resulted in Adams being suspended for one game by the CFL, which he did not appeal. With a playoff spot locked up several weeks before the season ended, Adams was named the team's Most Outstanding Player.

Following the cancellation of the 2020 CFL season, Adams returned to the Alouettes as their starting quarterback and continued his strong play into the 2021 season. Adams suffered a shoulder injury in the last few minutes of the team's Week 10 match against the Ottawa Redblacks. The next day it was announced that the Alouettes had placed Adams on the six-game injured reserve list. On November 10, 2021, head coach Khari Jones ruled out the possibility of Adams returning to the lineup late in the season. Adams played in eight games in the 2021 season. On December 16, 2021, Adams and the Alouettes agreed to a contract extension through the 2023 CFL season. Adams started the first game of the 2022 season, but after only gaining 21 yards of offense in the first quarter of the team's second game head coach Khari Jones turned to veteran quarterback Trevor Harris. After the first four games of the season, Khari Jones was fired and replaced by general manager Danny Maciocia: who retained Harris in his role as the starting quarterback. On July 27, 2022, Adams was added to the one-game injury list with an elbow injury. One week later, Adams was placed on the six-game injured reserve list with tendinitis in his throwing elbow.

BC Lions
On August 31, 2022, Adams was traded to the BC Lions in exchange for a first-round pick in the 2023 CFL Draft. 12 days later, Lions head coach Rick Campbell named Adams the starting quarterback for the Lions' Week 15 match against the Calgary Stampeders. Adams played in eight games for the Lions in 2022, starting in six, and compiled a 4–2 record before Nathan Rourke returned from injury. On February 8, 2023, Adams and the Lions agreed to a two-year contract extension. It is expected that Adams will serve as the Lions' starting quarterback in 2023 after Rourke departed for the NFL.

Career statistics

References

External links

BC Lions bio
Eastern Washington Eagles bio
Oregon Ducks bio
College Football Reference statistics

1993 births
Living people
Players of American football from Pasadena, California
Players of Canadian football from Pasadena, California
American football quarterbacks
Canadian football quarterbacks
African-American players of American football
African-American players of Canadian football
Eastern Washington Eagles football players
Oregon Ducks football players
Montreal Alouettes players
Saskatchewan Roughriders players
Hamilton Tiger-Cats players
BC Lions players
21st-century African-American sportspeople